Moon Records may refer to:
Moon Records Ukraine, a Ukrainian record label
Moon Records (Canada), a former Canadian record label (1973–1974) mainly for Rush
Moon Records (Japan), a Japanese record label; see Tatsuro Yamashita
Moon Ska Records, a former American record label